Avanci is a patent pool established in 2016 in the information and communications technology (ICT) space and more specifically in the Internet of things (IoT) space. It provides licenses to cellular technologies for the automotive industry by licensing patents from multiple owners under a single agreement. The company is based in Dallas, Texas, operating through offices in Dublin, Beijing, Tokyo, and Seoul.

As of 2022, Avanci has a consortium of 51 patent owners in its marketplace licensing their portfolios of eCall, 2G, 3G, and 4G standard essential patents. The company has estimated that almost 80-85% of connected cars are under the Avanci license. Patent owners on the platform include Ericsson, InterDigital, Nokia, Qualcomm and Sharp. The company also has over 80 auto brands under license, including Audi, BMW, Ford, General Motors, Honda, Mercedes-Benz, Nissan, Porsche, Renault, Stellantis, Toyota, Volkswagen and Volvo.

History
Avanci was founded in 2016 by Kasim Alfalahi, the former Chief Intellectual Property Officer at Ericsson. Ericsson was one of the first patent owners to join the Avanci marketplace, along with InterDigital, KPN, Qualcomm and ZTE. Later in 2016, Sony joined as well.

In 2017, BMW became the first automaker to sign a license agreement with Avanci, followed by Volvo, Audi, Porsche and Volkswagen. By 2018, twenty patent owners had agreed to license their IP through the platform, including Conversant, NTT Docomo and Nokia. In 2021, Daimler AG and Jaguar Land Rover joined the platform as licensees. In 2022, General Motors and Ford entered licensing deals with Avanci while LG Electronics and Pantech joined the platform as licensors. In September 2022, Honda, Nissan and Toyota signed licensing deals with Avanci, marking the first Japanese automakers to sign with the company.

In August 2022, Avanci hired Marianne Frydenlund from Nordic Semiconductor to lead the creation of new licensing programs for other IoT sectors. Hyundai and Kia also signed licensing deals later that month. In 2022, CEO Kasim Alfalahi was named one of the "50 most influential people in IP" by intellectual property publication Managing IP due to Avanci's growth in the automotive patent licensing space.

As of 2022, the company is developing an offering for 5G. The U.S. Department of Justice's Antitrust Division reviewed the proposed platform and in July 2020 concluded that the platform was unlikely to harm competition due to its fair, reasonable and nondiscriminatory (FRAND) rates and safeguards in place to protect competition.

In a 2023 article published in the Journal of Intellectual Property Law & Practice, authors Dr. Manveen Singh and Dr. Vishwas H. Devaiah note that standard essential patent licensing in the automotive sector has progressed in large part due to widespread industry participation in the Avanci platform as a one-stop shop for such licenses. The authors also point out that Avanci's model has found favor with courts and regulatory bodies in the U.S. and Europe.

See also
Essential patent

References

External links

Companies established in 2016
Licensing
Patent law organizations
Patent pools
Strategic alliances